Muslim Town is one of the neighbourhoods in New Karachi Town of Karachi, Sindh, Pakistan. It is closed to U.P society and Nagan Chorangi.

There are several ethnic groups in Muslim Town including Muhajirs, Sindhis, Kashmiris, Seraikis, Pakhtuns, Balochis, Memons, Bohras,  Ismailis, etc.

References

Neighbourhoods of Karachi